The Primitive Call is a 1917 American silent drama film directed by Bertram Bracken and starring Gladys Coburn, Fritz Leiber, and John Webb Dillion.

Cast

References

Bibliography
 Solomon, Aubrey. The Fox Film Corporation, 1915-1935: A History and Filmography. McFarland, 2011.

External links

1917 films
1917 drama films
1910s English-language films
American silent feature films
Silent American drama films
American black-and-white films
Films directed by Bertram Bracken
Fox Film films
1910s American films